Louise Marion Fraser (born 10 October 1970) is a female English former hurdler.

Athletics career
Fraser competed for Great Britain in the  400 metres hurdles at the 1992 Barcelona Olympics. She represented England in the 100 metres hurdles event, at the 1990 Commonwealth Games in Auckland, New Zealand.

International competitions

^Note: In the final at the 1990 Commonwealth Games, Fraser was disqualified after she hit the eighth and ninth hurdles and failed to finish.

References

External links
 

1970 births
Living people
Athletes (track and field) at the 1992 Summer Olympics
British female hurdlers
Olympic athletes of Great Britain
Athletes (track and field) at the 1990 Commonwealth Games
Commonwealth Games competitors for England